FK ŠVS Bradlan Brezová pod Bradlom is a Slovak football team, based in the town of Brezová pod Bradlom. The club was founded in 2001.

References

External links 
  

Football clubs in Slovakia
Association football clubs established in 2001
2001 establishments in Slovakia